is a Japanese manga series written and illustrated by Ayuko Hatta. It began serialization in Shueisha's Bessatsu Margaret magazine in December 2019. The series' individual chapters were collected into nine volumes from April 2020 to February 2023.

Publication
Written and illustrated by Ayuko Hatta, the series was serialized in Shueisha's Bessatsu Margaret magazine from December 13, 2019 to January 13, 2023. The series' individual chapters were collected into nine tankōbon volumes from April 24, 2020 to February 24, 2023.

In July 2021, Viz Media announced that they licensed the series for English publication.

Volume list

Reception
Rebecca Silverman from Anime News Network praised the main characters and their dynamic, while criticizing the story and artwork as generic. Sheena McNeil from Sequential Tart praised the story and characters as realistic; she also praised the artwork, believing it to be simple but effective.

References

External links
  
 

Drama anime and manga
Romance anime and manga
School life in anime and manga
Shōjo manga
Shueisha manga
Viz Media manga